The Adams County Courthouse is a building located in Council, Idaho which was built in 1915.  It was listed on the National Register of Historic Places in 1987.

It is a two-and-a-half-story building on a raised basement, located on a hill rising above Council's downtown, and appears monumental despite its small size. It has an L-shaped plan with the front entrance in the inside corner of the L.

See also

 List of National Historic Landmarks in Idaho
 National Register of Historic Places listings in Adams County, Idaho

References

1915 establishments in Idaho
Buildings and structures in Adams County, Idaho
Colonial Revival architecture in Idaho
Courthouses on the National Register of Historic Places in Idaho
Government buildings completed in 1915
National Register of Historic Places in Adams County, Idaho
1910s architecture in the United States